Kurashim is a rural locality (a selo) in Kukushtanskoye Rural Settlement, Permsky District, Perm Krai, Russia. The population was 2,513 as of 2010. There are 32 streets.

Geography 
Kurashim is located on the Kurashimovka River, 58 km southeast of Perm (the district's administrative centre) by road. Platoshino is the nearest rural locality.

References 

Rural localities in Permsky District